The Auckland Harbour Board was a public body that operated the ports of both Auckland and Onehunga from 1871 to 1988 and was dissolved in 1989. Its successor organisation is Ports of Auckland, which assumed the possessions and responsibilities of the Harbour Board.

History
In 1871 the Auckland Harbour Board was created by government ordinance and took over running Auckland's port from the Auckland Provincial Government. The harbour board offices were situated on the reclaimed ground at the lower end of Albert Street. Initially, the board consisted of thirteen members, who were elected by various interests for a period of two years. The chairman was elected by the members annually. In its first year, the revenue of the board was £12,498. By 1889 revenue had grown to £46,089, with the arrival of 2,441 sailing vessels and 3,756 steamers with a combined total tonnage of 980,816 tons.

Initially the Auckland Harbour Board's activities were exclusive to Waitematā Harbour before expanding the scope of its operations south to Manukau Harbour.

See also
Ports of Auckland
1989 local government reforms

Notes

References

 
Ports and harbours of New Zealand
Port operating companies
Companies based in Auckland
Transport in Auckland
Buildings and structures in Auckland
Transport companies of New Zealand
1871 establishments in New Zealand
1988 disestablishments in New Zealand
Auckland waterfront